Kazan Theological Seminary is the principal Russian Orthodox seminary in the Diocese of Kazan and Tatarstan.

History
Orthodox Christian Theological education has its roots dating back to 1718, when a school for the children of clergy was established in Kazan. This was followed by the opening of the Kazan Slavonic-Latin School in 1723, which was later reorganized as the Kazan Theological Seminary in 1732.

An attempt to provide higher education was made in 1798 through the establishment of the Kazan Theological Academy. However, this proved unsustainable and the institution was returned to the Kazan Theological Seminary in 1818. However, in 1842, the Theological Academy was revived and continued to function until the Bolshevik takeover in 1917, during which time it became the fourth-ranked theological academy in the Russian Empire.

In 1847, the Kazan academy supported the missionary efforts of the Kazan Diocese by organizing a committee to oversee the translation of texts to reach non-Christian peoples. During the tenure of Grigory Postnikov as the bishop of the Kazan Diocese (1848 to 1856), the Academy received the extensive library from the Solovetsky Monastery. In 1895, Anthony of Kiev became the rector of the Academy, serving until 1900.

Notable people associated with the academy
The Kazan Academy produced over eighty students who later were consecrated bishops. Some of these became regarded as martyrs by the Russian Orthodox Church, including:
 Gavrill Abolimov
 Anatoly Grisyuk the rector of the academy
 Athanasy Malinin
 Juvenaly Maslovsky
 Victor Ostrovidov
 Ioann Poyarkov
 Iov Rogozhin
 German Ryashentsev
 Gury Stepanov
 Ioasaf Udalov
 Nikolay Ilminsky

Others:
 Ilia Berdnikov - an expert in church law
 Nikolai Ostroumov
 Victor Nesmelov - a philosopher
 Gordiy Sablukov (1804–1880) - an expert on Islam, who produced the first Russian translation of the Koran
 Peter Znamensky - a historian

References

 Kazan Diocese

Russian Orthodox Church in Russia
Buildings and structures in Kazan
Educational institutions established in 1718
Eastern Orthodox seminaries
Universities and colleges affiliated with the Russian Orthodox Church
History of the Russian Orthodox Church
Christianity in Kazan
1718 establishments in Russia